Lieutenant General John William Leonard (January 25, 1890 – October 26, 1974) was a senior United States Army officer who served during World War I, World War II and Cold War.

Early years and World War I
John William Leonard was born on January 25, 1890, in Toledo, Ohio, as a son of Dennis and Anastasia Leonard. He graduated from the United States Military Academy in 1915, as part of "the class the stars fell on", a famous class of West Point, from which Dwight D. Eisenhower and Omar N. Bradley graduated. Many years later Dwight D. Eisenhower would introduce John to his future wife.

His first war service was at Mexico–United States border. Then, in May 1918, he was sent as a member of the 6th Infantry Regiment of the 5th Infantry Division within American Expeditionary Forces to the France.

Reaching the rank of major, Leonard commanded a battalion of the 6th Infantry Regiment during Battle of Saint-Mihiel and Meuse-Argonne Offensive. For his bravery on the battlefield near the village of Romagne-sous-Montfaucon, Major Leonard was promoted to the rank of lieutenant colonel and decorated with the Distinguished Service Cross, Purple Heart French Legion of Honor, Croix de Guerre with Palm and French Fourragère.

Distinguished Service Cross citation
His official Distinguished Service Cross citation reads:
General Orders: War Department, General Orders No. 37 (1919)
Action Date: October 14, 1918
Name: John William Leonard
Service: Army
Rank: Lieutenant Colonel
Regiment: 6th Infantry Regiment
Division: 5th Division, American Expeditionary Forces
Citation: The President of the United States of America, authorized by Act of Congress, July 9, 1918, takes pleasure in presenting the Distinguished Service Cross to Lieutenant Colonel (Infantry), [then Major] John William Leonard (ASN: 0-3840), United States Army, for extraordinary heroism in action while serving with 6th Infantry Regiment, 5th Division, A.E.F., near Romagne, France, 14 October 1918. Lieutenant Colonel Leonard personally led the assaulting wave in an attack under severe shell and machine-gun fire from the front arid flanks. Upon reaching the objective he directed the organization of the position, and by his example of fearlessness rallied his men and kept his line intact.

After the war, Leonard stayed in Europe for occupation duties until October, 1921. Then he served on various posts, including  a posting to Tientsin China 1933–1936. In 1936, Leonard was appointed an Instructor for Maryland National Guard and stayed in this capacity until 1940. Then he spent some time on the staff of the 2nd Infantry Division under command of Major General James Lawton Collins.

World War II
During the year 1941, Leonard was promoted to the capacity of the commanding officer of the 6th Armored Infantry Regiment, which was now a part of the 1st Armored Division under the command of Major General Bruce Magruder. During this time, 6th Armored Infantry Regiment was stationed with whole 1st Armored Division at Fort Knox in Kentucky. Leonard was promoted to the rank of brigadier general on June 20, 1942.

During the summer of 1942 Brigadier General Leonard was put in command of the newly activated 9th Armored Division at Fort Riley, Kansas. In this capacity, Leonard replaced Major General Geoffrey Keyes at the end of September, 1942. On October 27, 1942, Leonard got his second star, when he was promoted to the rank of major general.

Two years later, in September 1944, 9th Armored Division was transferred to the United Kingdom, from where it was immediately ordered to Normandy.

Leonard continued as its commander until the end of the war, when he became commander of the 20th Armored Division. During the period between the wars, he served as commandant of the Armor School from 1946, and as military attaché in the United Kingdom from 1948. In 1950 he was promoted to lieutenant general and commanded both the V Corps and the XVIII Airborne Corps when it was reestablished on 31 May 1951. He retired from the army in January 1952. Upon his death in 1974 he was buried in Arlington National Cemetery.

Decorations
Lieutenant General Leonard´s ribbon bar:

Gallery

References

External links
Generals of World War II

|-

|-

|-

|-

1890 births
1974 deaths
United States military attachés
United States Army Infantry Branch personnel
Burials at Arlington National Cemetery
United States Military Academy alumni
Recipients of the Distinguished Service Cross (United States)
Recipients of the Distinguished Service Medal (US Army)
Recipients of the Silver Star
Recipients of the Legion of Merit
Military personnel from Ohio
Graduates of the United States Military Academy Class of 1915
United States Army generals of World War II
United States Army generals
United States Army personnel of World War I